Herkes may refer to:

 Bob Herkes (born 1957), former English cricketer
 Herkes Kendi Evinde a 2001 Turkish drama film
 James Neville Burnett-Herkes (1912-1979), Bermudian politician